Wiesent is a river located in Bavaria, Germany. It is a right tributary of the river Regnitz. It is the main river of the Franconian Switzerland region, rising near the village Steinfeld. It flows through the towns Hollfeld, Muggendorf and Ebermannstadt, and joins the Regnitz in Forchheim.

See also
List of rivers of Bavaria

References

Rivers of Bavaria
Rivers of Germany